The Papyrus Larousse Britannica (Πάπυρος Larousse Britannica) is a Greek language encyclopedia of 61 volumes, based on the French encyclopedia Grand Larousse encyclopédique and the English Encyclopædia Britannica.

See also
 List of Greek encyclopedias

References

External links 
www.papyrosonline.gr

Greek encyclopedias
Non-English works based on the Encyclopædia Britannica